Kostyantyn Oleksiyovych Yefymenko (born 26 June 1975) is a Ukrainian businessman and politician who served as Minister of Transport and Communications of Ukraine from 11 March to 9 December 2010, as well as First Deputy Minister of Infrastructure of Ukraine from 23 December 2010 to 15 April 2014. Yefymenko currently serves as president of the Bilyi Bars Ice Hockey Club.

Biography 
In 1992, Kostyantyn Efymenko left the school No. 13 of Bila Tserkva with a silver medal for academic achievements.
In 1997, Efymenko graduated at the Economics Faculty of Taras Shevchenko National University of Kyiv with a degree in 'Accounting and Audit'.

Efymenko is married, has three children – two daughters and a son.

Political activity 
From 2008 to 2009, Yefymenko served as a deputy of the Kyiv Oblast Council as a member of the Yulia Tymoshenko Bloc faction. He also served on the Bila Tserkva City Council.

On 11 March 2010, Yefymenko was appointed Minister of Transport and Communications of Ukraine, serving in the position until 9 December 2010. After that, from 23 December 2010 to 15 April 2014, Yefymenko served as First Deputy Minister of Infrastructure of Ukraine.

In 2015, Yefymenko ran for mayor of Bila Tserkva, but lost in the second round to Henadiy Dikiy, who got 39.3% of actual votes.

Since 2018, he has been a speaker at major business conferences, including the Business Concentrate, Terrasoft, Business Anatomy, and sessions of the Kyiv International Economic Forum.

Career and business activity
1995–1996 — Veksel insurance company;

1997–1998 — Ukrgazprompolis insurance company;

1998–2002 — chairman of the board of Ukrgazprompolis insurance company;

2002–2008 — Deputy Director general for Economic Affairs; Director for Scientific and Technical Affairs; Director for Economic and Accounting policy of UkrTransGaz;

2008–2009 – Chairman of the Supervisory Board of OJSC "Biopharma".

2009—2010 – Director of Ukrtransgaz NJSC Naftogaz of Ukraine.

Since 2014 – President of the pharmaceutical company "Biopharma".

Since 2014 – chairman of the board of directors of the Tribo Group of Companies.

Since 2017 – chief operating officer of "Biopharma".

Biofarma 
Since 2014, Konstantin Yefimenko has been the president of the pharmaceutical company Biopharma, a Ukrainian company specializing in the development and production of immunobiological drugs from human donor plasma. The company is among the top 10 largest Ukrainian manufacturers in the industry.

In 2019, a new Biopharma plasma processing plant was opened in Bila Tserkva worth of $75 million investments.

In December 2019, Biopharma sold part of the company to the German pharmaceutical manufacturer STADA.

In 2020, Biopharma is focused on combating the COVID-19 pandemic.

Tribo 
Kostyantyn Efymenko is also a Chairman of board of directors of Tribo Ltd. Tribo is the official supplier of original spare parts for MAZ, KrAZ and BelAZ plants. The UK-based subsidiary Tribo Rail supplies products to European markets and works with Siemens, Bombardier, Alston and other well-known manufacturers in the field of railway technology.

The production line includes more than 800 products for such industrial groups as rail transport, trucks, agricultural and special equipment, industrial equipment.

Social activities and charity 
In 2011, Kostyantyn Efymenko established the charitable foundation in Bila Tserkva. The Foundation implements and supports socio-cultural, educational, health caring, historical, tourist and other programs related to the city's life and development.

In 2011–2013, archeological excavations were carried out on the Castle Hill at the expense of the Konstantin Yefimenko Charitable Foundation. They took place in three stages: the first section – for the transfer of the monument to Yaroslav the Wise, the second – for the construction of a religious building, and the third – for the museification of the foundations (one and a half apses) of the ancient temple of the thirteenth century. The found artifacts were transferred to the Bila Tserkva Museum of Local Lore, and later will be placed in the lower church, where it is planned to equip the museum of the findings of the Castle Hill.

The Kostyantyn Yefimenko Foundation finances the work of coaches, uniforms, equipment and classes at the White Leopard Ice Arena are free for children from the figure skating and hockey sections of Bila Tserkva CYSS "Zmina", where more than 200 young people from Bila Tserkva are engaged.

The charity fund successfully implements a number of social projects aimed at supporting the most vulnerable segments of the population: "Academy of Pensioners", "Help to have a child", "Start of Hope", "Spartakiad", nominal scholarships for the best students.

References

External links 
 Kostyantyn Efymenko: photo, biography, dossier 
 Kostyantyn Efymenko's blog on ЛІГА.net 
 Kostyantyn Efymenko Charity Fund 

Ukrainian businesspeople
Transportation and communications ministers of Ukraine
1975 births
People from Bila Tserkva
Politicians from Bila Tserkva
Living people
Taras Shevchenko National University of Kyiv alumni
Businesspeople in the pharmaceutical industry